Harpesaurus tricinctus, the Java nose-horned lizard, is a species of agamid lizard. It is endemic to Indonesia.

References

Harpesaurus
Reptiles of Indonesia
Reptiles described in 1851
Taxa named by André Marie Constant Duméril